Jean Marzollo (June 24, 1942 – April 10, 2018) was an American children's author and illustrator. She wrote more than 100 books, including the best-selling and award-winning I Spy series for children, written completely in rhythm and rhyme.

Biography
Born and raised in Connecticut, Marzollo was a graduate of Manchester High School (1960), the University of Connecticut (1964) where she was a member of Kappa Alpha Theta, and the Harvard Graduate School of Education (1965).

Marzollo was a high school English teacher in Arlington, MA (1965–1966) and the assistant director of Harvard's Project Upward Bound (1967). In New York City, she worked on early childhood research projects for General Learning Corp. (1967–1969) and was the Director of Publications for the National Commission on Resources for Youth (1970–1971).

For 20 years (1972–1992), she edited Scholastic's "Let's Find Out" Magazine, working closely with art director Carol Devine Carson. She has written books for teachers and parents, as well as articles about children for Parents Magazine, Redbook, and other parenting magazines.

Marzollo was known for her best-selling and award-winning I Spy series with photographic illustrator Walter Wick.  Among her other children's books are: Help Me Learn Addition, Help Me Learn Numbers 0-20, The Little Plant Doctor, Pierre the Penguin, Mama Mama/Papa Papa, Close Your Eyes, Pretend You're a Cat, Happy Birthday, Martin Luther King, and the Shanna Show books. After more than twenty years of writing children's books, she also began to illustrate them. She retold and illustrated five Bible stories and three Greek myths, as well as writing and illustrating two counting books for preschoolers: Ten Little Eggs and Ten Little Christmas Presents.

Death
Marzollo died on April 10, 2018, in her sleep due to natural causes at the age of 75.  She was survived by her husband, Claudio Marzollo, a retired sculptor who co-authored some of her children's science fiction and fantasy books, and two sons.

Published works
 
 9 Months 1 Day 1 Year: A Guide to Pregnancy, Birth and Babycare, 
 39 Kids on the Block: Chicken Pox Strikes Again #5
 39 Kids on the Block: My Sister the Blabbermouth #6 
 39 Kids on the Block: Roses are Pink and You Stink #3
 39 Kids on the Block: The Best Friends Club #4
 39 Kids on the Block: The Best Present Ever #2
 39 Kids on the Block: The Green Ghost of Appleville #1 
 Amy Goes Fishing
 Baby Unicorn and Baby Dragon 
 Baby's Alphabet
 Baseball Brothers
 Basketball Buddies 
 Baxter Bear’s Bad Day 
 Birthday Parties for Children 
 Blue Sun Ben
 Can We Eat Now? 
 Cannonball Chris 
 Christmas Cats
 Cinderella 
 City Sounds
 Close Your Eyes 
 Daniel in the Lions' Den
 David and Goliath
 Do You Know New? 
 Do You Love Me, Harvey Burns? 
 Doll House Adventure
 Doll House Christmas 
 Fathers & Babies 
 Fathers & Toddlers 
 Football Friends 
 Getting Your Period
 Halfway Down Paddy Lane
 Halloween Cats 
 Happy Birthday, Martin Luther King
 Help Me Learn Addition 
 Help Me Learn Numbers 0-20 
 Help Me learn Subtraction
 Helping Hands Handbook
 Hockey Hero 
 Home Sweet Home 
 How Kids Grow 
 I Am a Leaf 
 I Am a Rock 
 I Am a Star
 I Am an Apple 
 I Am Fire 
 I Am Planet Earth
 I Am Snow 
 I Am Water 
 I Love You: A Rebus Poem
 I See a Star: A Christmas Rebus Story
 I Spy a Balloon
 I Spy a Butterfly 
 I Spy a Candy Cane
 I Spy a Dinosaur's Eye
 I Spy a Penguin
 I Spy a Pumpkin
 I Spy a Scary Monster 
 I Spy a School Bus
 I Spy a Skeleton
 I Spy A to Z
 I SPY an Egg in a Nest 
 I Spy Christmas 
 I Spy Extreme Challenger!
 I Spy Fantasy 
 I Spy Fun House 
 I Spy Funny Teeth
 I Spy Gold Challenger!
 I Spy I Like to Read 
 I Spy I Love You
 I Spy Lightning in the Sky
 I Spy Little Animals 
 I Spy Little Book 
 I Spy Little Bunnies 
 I Spy Little Christmas
 I Spy Little Hearts
 I Spy Little Letters 
 I Spy Little Numbers
 I Spy Little Toys 
 I Spy Merry Christmas 
 I Spy Little Wheels 
 I Spy Mystery 
 I Spy Phonics Fun 
 I Spy Santa Claus 
 I Spy School 
 I Spy School Days 
 I Spy Spectacular 
 I Spy Spooky Night 
 I Spy Sticker Book and Picture Riddles 
 I Spy Super Challenger! 
 I Spy Thanksgiving 
 I Spy Treasure Hunt 
 I Spy Ultimate Challenger! 
 I Spy Year-Round Challenger!
 I Spy: A Book of Picture Riddles
 I’m A Seed 
 I’m Tyrannosaurus! 
 I'm a Caterpillar 
 In 1492 
 In 1776 
 Jed and the Space Bandits 
 Jed’s Junior Space Patrol 
 Jonah and the Whale (and the Worm)
 Learning through Play 
 Let's Go, Pegasus! 
 Little Bear, You're A Star!
 Mama Mama 
 Miriam and Her Brother Moses
 My First Book of Biographies 
 Once Upon a Springtime
 Pandora's Box 
 Papa Bear’s Party 
 Papa Papa 
 Pierre the Penguin 
 Pizza Pie Slugger
 Pony Bird
 Pretend You're a Cat 
 Red Ribbon Rosie 
 Red Sun Girl 
 Robin of Bray
 Ruth and Naomi 
 Ruthie’s Rude Friends 
 Shanna's Animal Riddles
 Shanna's Ballerina Show 
 Shanna's Bear Hunt
 Shanna's Doctor Show 
 Shanna's Hip, Hop, Hooray!
 Shanna's Lost Shoe
 Shanna's Party Surprise
 Shanna's Pizza Parlor
 Shanna's Princess Show 
 Shanna's Teacher Show 
 Slam Dunk Saturday 
 Snow Angel 
 Soccer Cousins 
 Soccer Sam 
 Sun Song 
 Superkids
 Supertot 
 Ten Cats Have Hats
 Ten Little Christmas Presents
 Ten Little Eggs
 Thanksgiving Cats 
 The Baby Unicorn 
 The Little Plant Doctor 
 The New Kindergarten 
 The Rebus Treasury 
 The Silver Bear 
 The Teddy Bear Book 
 Think! Draw! Write!
 Three Little Kittens 
 Uproar on Holler Cat Hill
 Valentine Cats 
 Your Maternity Leave: How to Leave Work, Have a Baby, and Go Back to Work Without Getting Lost, Trapped, or Sandbagged Along the Way

References

Sources
Gale Cengage Learning:  Contemporary Authors, volume(s) 81–84, 264
Contemporary Authors Autobiographical Essay, volume(s) 264
Contemporary Authors New Revision Series, volume(s) 15, 90
Major Authors and Illustrators for Children and Young Adults, edition(s) 2
Something About the Author, volume(s) 29, 77, 130
Something About the Author Autobiography Series, volume(s) 15

External links

Harper Collins
Scholastic

1942 births
2018 deaths
American children's writers
American children's book illustrators
People from Manchester, Connecticut
Writers from Connecticut
University of Connecticut alumni
Harvard Graduate School of Education alumni